Curali may refer to:
Curali, Turkey in Yozgat
Cürəli (disambiguation), several places in Azerbaijan